Shuko Aoyama and Misaki Doi were the defending champions, however Doi chose not to participate. Aoyama partnered Junri Namigata, but lost in the final to Eri Hozumi and Makoto Ninomiya in an all-Japanese final, 6–3, 7–5.

Seeds

Draw

References 
 Draw

Dunlop World Challenge - Doubles
2014 WD
2014 Dunlop World Challenge